Otgol Village is the clan village of the Gyeongju Choi located east of Daegu, South Korea. 

Otgol consists of approximately 20 houses in the common Joseon period style; most are not original and those that are, have been heavily rebuilt over time. There are two 100-year-old locust trees standing at the entrance to the village.

References 
http://100.naver.com/100.nhn?docid=796298

Villages in South Korea
Dong District, Daegu